Roy Louis Hugo (17 July 1909 – 25 November 1982) was an Australian rules footballer who played with St Kilda in the Victorian Football League (VFL).

Notes

External links 

Roy Hugo's playing statistics from The VFA Project

1909 births
1982 deaths
Australian rules footballers from Victoria (Australia)
St Kilda Football Club players
Box Hill Football Club players